Diorygma sticticum is a species of lichen in the family Graphidaceae. It was described as new to science in 2011. It is found in Thailand.

References

sticticum
Lichen species
Lichens described in 2011
Lichens of Asia
Taxa named by Klaus Kalb
Taxa named by Robert Lücking